Fluorine forms diatomic molecules that are gaseous at room temperature with a density about 1.3 times that of air. Though sometimes cited as yellow-green, pure fluorine gas is actually a very pale yellow. The color can only be observed in concentrated fluorine gas when looking down the axis of long tubes, as it appears transparent when observed from the side in normal tubes or if allowed to escape into the atmosphere. The element has a "pungent" characteristic odor that is noticeable in concentrations as low as 20 ppb.

Fluorine condenses to a bright yellow liquid at −188 °C (−307 °F), which is near the condensation temperatures of oxygen and nitrogen.  

The solid state of fluorine relies on Van der Waals forces to hold molecules together, which, because of the small size of the fluorine molecules, are relatively weak. Consequently, the solid state of fluorine is more similar to that of oxygen or the noble gases than to those of the heavier halogens.

Fluorine solidifies at −220 °C (−363 °F) into a cubic structure, called beta-fluorine. This phase is transparent and soft, with significant disorder of the molecules; its density is 1.70 g/cm3. At −228 °C (−378 °F) fluorine undergoes a solid–solid phase transition into a monoclinic structure called alpha-fluorine. This phase is opaque and hard, with close-packed layers of molecules, and is denser at 1.97 g/cm3. The solid state phase change requires more energy than the melting point transition and can be violent, shattering samples and blowing out sample holder windows.

Solid fluorine received significant study in the 1920s and 30s, but relatively less until the 1960s. The crystal structure of alpha-fluorine given, which still has some uncertainty, dates to a 1970 paper by Linus Pauling.

Notes

Citations

Indexed references

Further reading

http://www.osti.gov/bridge/servlets/purl/4010212-0BbwUC/4010212.pdf (phase diagrams of the elements)
http://jcp.aip.org/resource/1/jcpsa6/v47/i2/p740_s1?isAuthorized=no (sample holder blowout)
NASA ADS: Solid Fluorine and Solid Chlorine: Crystal Structures and Intermolecular Forces by S. C. Nyburg

Fluorine
Phases of matter
Allotropes